Manas International Public School is an International School located in Jehanabad India. It is privately run by Dr Arun Kumar Sinha. The school has two campuses: one in the Court Area of Jehanabad and the other in Dakshini. The school is affiliated to CBSE.

A new venture under Manas International Educational Foundation is Manas International Kid's School. The school was officially launched on 14.01.2013

. The school will be run by Seema Sinha, who will be heading the school as its Principal. Seema Sinha is an engineer in electrical and electronics and has significant exposure to the schooling industry in India.

References

External links 

International schools in India
Jehanabad
Schools in Bihar
2013 establishments in Bihar
Educational institutions established in 2013